SCVNGR (SCaVeNGeR) was a social location-based gaming platform for mobile phones.SCVNGR is part game, part game platform. Playing SCVNGR is all about going places, doing challenges and earning points. Players discover cool new places, find fun new things to do, share their activity with friends and can even earn virtual (and sometimes real-world) rewards! Individuals and institutions can build on SCVNGR by adding custom challenges at their favorite places!Start playing SCVNGR now at www.scvngr.com.

History 
SCVNGR was founded by Seth Priebatsch.

In February 2011, it was speculated that SCVNGR had reached over 1 million users. In March 2011, SCVNGR launched LevelUp, a mobile payments platform to increase engagement and loyalty at local businesses. The SCVNGR Android app was silently pulled out of Google Play store sometime in early 2012.

As of 2021, scvngr.com redirects to thelevelup.com, a spinoff company and product that was acquired by GrubHub in 2018.

Description 
The application had both a consumer and enterprise component. Companies, educational institutions, and organizations could build challenges, the core unit of their game, at places on SCVNGR from the web. The service also supported SMS. SCVNGR is building a game "layer" on top of the world.

Players could earn points by going places and doing challenges, and could broadcast where they were and their activities to their friends on Facebook and Twitter. By doing challenges, players could unlock badges and real-world rewards, such as discounts or free items. By June 2010, over 1000 companies, educational institutions, and organizations had built on SCVNGR by creating challenges (and often rewards) at their locations.

Examples of SCVNGR use in education
At educational institutions, SCVNGR was mostly utilized as a tool for orientation for prospective and new students to college campuses (for example at the University of Louisville in Kentucky). Rather than having a traditional tour guide approach to orientation, colleges used the SCVNGR application to entice students to visit places they want students to know about, to receive rewards and as an icebreaker for meeting new people. The app was also used for orientation to campus libraries; for example, librarians from Boise State University and Oregon State University have created SCVNGR hunts and documented its use for library introductions for international students and bibliographic instruction.

Funding

Funding is the act of providing resources to finance a need, program, or project. While this is usually in the form of money, it can also take the form of effort or time from an organization or company.The basic lack of government funding is at the core of the problem.Interest in the project fizzled after the funding was withdrawn.The project suddenly got a new lease of life when the developers agreed to provide some more funding.The education director is persevering in his attempt to obtain additional funding for the school.We were unable to get funding and therefore had to abandon the project.

What is funding and its types? 

 Summary. The main sources of funding are retained earnings, debt capital, and equity capital. Companies use retained earnings from business operations to expand or distribute dividends to their shareholders. Businesses raise funds by borrowing debt privately from a bank or by going public (issuing debt securities).

What funding source means? 
Funding sources are budgetary resources for programs and projects. Funding types include grants, bonds, federal or state awards, private donations, or internal money that is allocated for a company or an organization.

What is the value of funding? 
Value funds are equity mutual funds that adopt a value investing strategy. For example, they invest in discounted or undervalued stocks for long-term growth. Value funds are often contrasted with growth funds, which target emerging, fast-growing companies.
 In June 2008 the company raised a $35k Seed round with DreamIt Ventures.
 In August 2009 a $750k round was raised with Highland Capital Partners.
 In January 2010 a $4M Series B round was raised with Google Ventures, Highland Capital Partners and DreamIT Ventures.
 In January 2011 an additional $15M round was raised with Google Ventures, Balderton Capital, and Highland Capital
 In June 2012 a $12M Series D round was raised with Google Ventures, Transmedia Capital, Highland Capital Partners, and Balderton Capital – and in August of the same year an additional $9M Series D round was raised with T-Venture.

See also
 Geosocial networking
 Gowalla
 Location-based game
 Social network game
 Gbanga

References

External links
 

Geosocial networking
Location-based games
Software companies based in Massachusetts
Mobile social software
Mobile games
GV companies
Software companies of the United States